Mary Aldis may refer to:

 Mary Aldis (playwright) (1872–1949), American playwright
 Mary Aldis (science writer) (c. 1838 – 1897), New Zealander science writer